Oxford Nanopore Technologies Limited is a UK-based company which is developing and selling nanopore sequencing products (including the portable DNA sequencer, MinION) for the direct, electronic analysis of single molecules.

History
The company was founded in 2005 as a spin-out from the University of Oxford by Hagan Bayley, Gordon Sanghera, and Spike Willcocks, with seed funding from the IP Group. By May 2021, over several rounds of investment, the company had privately raised over £990 million from leading investors including M&G Catalyst and Temasek. The company raised a further £350 million in its initial public offering on the London Stock Exchange on 30 September 2021, under the ticker LSE:ONT.L

Products

The main products of Oxford Nanopore are:
 MinION: this portable protein nanopore sequencing USB device has been commercially available since May 2015 after having been launched initially through an early access programme, the MinION Access Programme (MAP). An editorial describes the rapid pace of development during the MAP: “We have had three 'pore' changes ... six chemistry changes and a software update seemingly every few weeks.”. Publications from this programme outline its use in rapid identification of viral pathogens, monitoring ebola, environmental monitoring, food safety monitoring, monitoring of antibiotic resistance, analysis of structural variants in cancer,  haplotyping, analysis of foetal DNA, and other applications. Publications indicate a read rate of 90 nucleotides per second per nanopore  with an error rate of 30% during the early phase of its release around 2014. With the latest R9 release in 2016 raw error rates have been reduced to between 2-13% for various types of DNA sequencing ('1D' vs '2D', described below). In October 2016 R9.4 was released running at 450 bases per second per nanopore for 10 Gb data per MinION Flow Cell. More recently, the R10 pore has been developed and with a different aperture, it has different read out characteristics, early data from ONT show that the R10 pores can overcome homopolymer sequences. 
 GridION X5: this desktop device has been commercially available since March 2017. The device processes up to five MinION Flow Cells and enables generation of up to 100 Gb of data per run.
 PromethION: this desktop, high throughput device will be available through an access programme that opened for registration in July 2015. The device contains channels for 144,000 nanopores (in comparison to MinION’s 512).
 VolTRAX: this device, currently in development, is designed for automated sample preparation so that users do not need a laboratory or lab skills to run the device. Registration for the early access programme was opened in October 2016. 
 Metrichor: this spinout company from Oxford Nanopore was set up to provide end to end solutions for biological analyses, using nanopore sensing technologies.
 SmidgION:  a mobile phone sequencer announced in May 2016, currently in development.

These products are intended to be used for the analysis of DNA, RNA, proteins and small molecules with a range of applications in personalized medicine, crop science, and scientific research.

As of October 2016, over 3,000 MinIONs have been shipped. PromethION has started to ship in early access. In a paper published in November 2014, one of the MAP participants wrote, "The MinION is an exciting step in a new direction for single-molecule sequencing, though it will require dramatic decreases in error rates before it lives up to its promise.". By August 2016, bioinformatician Jared Simpson noted that 99.96% consensus accuracy was generated using the nanopolish tool after raw accuracy had been improved with the new R9 nanopore.

In July 2015, a group published on nanopore sequencing of an influenza genome, noting “A complete influenza virus genome was obtained that shared greater than 99% identity with sequence data obtained from the Illumina Miseq and traditional Sanger-sequencing. The laboratory infrastructure and computing resources used to perform this experiment on the MinION nanopore sequencer would be available in most molecular laboratories around the world. Using this system, the concept of portability, and thus sequencing influenza viruses in the clinic or field is now tenable.“ In a paper and accompanying editorial  published in October 2015, a group of MinION users wrote, “At the time of this writing, around a dozen reports have emerged recounting utility of the MinION for de novo sequencing of viral, bacterial, and eukaryotic genomes.”.

In March 2016 the company announced a chemistry upgrade to ‘R9’, using the protein nanopore CsgG in collaboration with the lab of Han Remaut (VIB/Vrije Universiteit Brussel). The Company stated in a webcast that R9 is designed to improve error rates and yield.  In late May 2016, the R9 nanopore was launched and users have reported high performance levels with the upgraded flow cells.  Early reports on social media report high levels of '1D' accuracy (sequencing one strand of the duplex DNA), '2D' accuracy (sequencing both the template and complement strand) and assembled accuracy.

The company also actively develops and distributes software to help with the analysis of the sequencing data produced by the Nanopore technology. One of these is the Guppy toolkit, a GPU-based base-caller and sequence analysis softwares written in the Python language.

Internet of Living Things
Oxford Nanopore has worked to establish the concept of an 'Internet of Living Things', originally conceived as an 'Internet of DNA' by David Haussler, a bioinformatician based at UC Santa Cruz. In an article in Wired in 2015, Clive Brown, CTO of Oxford Nanopore noted that "future nanopore sensing devices linked to cloud based analyses could run anywhere on anything." 
 
The concept of an Internet of Living Things was referenced in a 2015 paper by Yaniv Erlich describing a future of ubiquitous genomics. Erlich noted that "multiple appliances could benefit from integration with sequencing sensors, including air conditioning or the main water supply to monitor harmful pathogens. However, of all possible options, toilets may offer the best integration point.”. For health-related applications he noted that "rapid sequencing at airport checkpoints might be 
useful to control pathogen outbreaks and offer medical assistance to affected passengers. Similarly, a 
portable sequencer will enable physicians to provide more accurate diagnoses in the field during humanitarian crises or in the clinic without the need to waste time by sending samples to a lab.”

International Space Station Mission 

In July 2016, a MinION nanopore sequencer was included on the ninth NASA/SpaceX commercial cargo resupply services mission to the International Space Station. The aim of the mission is to provide proof of concept for the MinION’s functionality in a microgravity environment and then explore further uses on board. It has been suggested that the ability to execute DNA sequencing in space will allow monitoring of changes in microbes in the environment or humans in response to spaceflight, and possibly aid in the detection of DNA-based life elsewhere in the universe.

During the mission, ISS crew members successfully sequenced DNA from bacteria, bacteriophage and rodents from samples prepared on Earth. Researchers on Earth performed synchronous ground controls to evaluate how well the MinION works in the difficult conditions. Additionally, maintaining the MinION device as a research facility on the space station holds the potential to support a number of additional science investigations, any of which could have Earth based applications.

References

External links 
 Oxford Nanopore Technologies Website

British companies established in 2005
Companies based in Oxford
Genomics companies
Technology companies established in 2005
Companies listed on the London Stock Exchange